Juan Francisco Argeñal Espinal (born 21 January 1954 in Choluteca) is a Honduran politician. He currently serves as deputy of the National Congress of Honduras representing the National Party of Honduras for Choluteca.

References

1954 births
Living people
People from Choluteca Department
Deputies of the National Congress of Honduras
National Party of Honduras politicians